Jessica Wong (born March 29, 1991), also known by the Chinese name Wang Yuting, is a Canadian ice hockey player and member of the Chinese national ice hockey team, currently playing in the Zhenskaya Hockey League (ZhHL) with the KRS Vanke Rays. She was drafted first overall in the 2013 CWHL Draft by the Calgary Inferno and played four seasons in the Canadian Women's Hockey League (CWHL) – two seasons with the Inferno and two seasons with the Shenzhen KRS Vanke Rays (previously Kunlun Red Star WIH). She is one of three players, along with Rachel Llanes and Maddie Woo, from the inaugural Kunlun Red Star WIH season, still playing with the KRS Vanke Rays organization.

She represented Canada with the national under-18 ice hockey team at the 2009 IIHF Women's U18 World Championship, winning a silver medal, and with the Canadian national under-22 team at the MLP Nations Cups in 2010 and 2011, winning gold at both tournaments.

Wong represented China in the women's ice hockey tournament at the 2022 Winter Olympics in Beijing.

Playing career
Wong captained the Warner Warriors in 2006–07, leading the team in scoring and was awarded MVP honors. She played for Nova Scotia at the 2006 Esso Women's Nationals in her hometown of Sydney, Nova Scotia, with a fifth-place finish. Wong also played for Team Atlantic at the 2007 Canadian National Women's Under-18 Championship; the team finished in fourth place. In 2007, she represented Nova Scotia at the 2007 Canada Winter Games, where the team finished in sixth. Wong was also part of three Atlantic Challenge Cups for Nova Scotia, winning two gold medals (2005, 2007) and one silver (2006).

In addition, Wong played for Team Atlantic at the 2008 National Women's Under-18 Championship with an eighth-place finish. In the same year, Wong played with Stoney Creek in Ontario. She won a gold medal with the Stoney Creek Sabres at the Ontario Women's Hockey Association (OWHA) provincials and at the Provincial Women's Hockey League (PWHL) championship in 2008. In 2009, she won a silver medal with Stoney Creek at the OWHA provincials while ranking fourth on the team in scoring.

NCAA
Wong joined the Minnesota Duluth Bulldogs women's ice hockey program in the Western Collegiate Hockey Association (WCHA) conference of the NCAA Division I in the 2009–10 season. She scored the game-winning goal in triple overtime of the championship final of the 2010 NCAA National Collegiate Women's Ice Hockey Tournament and was named to the All-Tournament Team. Wong finished fourth among Minnesota Duluth rookies in scoring for the 2009–10 season.

During the 2010–11 season, Wong converted from forward to an offensive-defenseman. She finished second in the NCAA among all blueliners with 38 points (15g+23a), averaging a blistering 1.15 points per game. She also led all WCHA defensemen with 31 points in conference play (10g, 21a) and ranked No. 7 in the WCHA with 12 power-play points, as well as 12th for points among all conference players. Wong was named to the 2010–11 All-WCHA Second Team. She finished as the second-leading point scorer among all Bulldog players, netting her first collegiate hat-trick against Connecticut on October 23, 2010.

CWHL
Wong was selected first overall by the Calgary Inferno in the 2013 CWHL Draft. On February 2, 2014, Wong logged a goal, with Danielle Stone earning an assist (Stone would break two scoring records in Inferno franchise history during that game), providing her with seven points in the first five games of her CWHL career, a new franchise record for the Inferno. Of note, she was selected to participate in the 2014 CWHL All-Star Game, the first in league history.  She retired after two seasons to a position with Hockey Canada in Calgary. 

In 2017, she came out of retirement to play for the China-based expansion team Kunlun Red Star. The team merged with the Vanke Rays to become the KRS Vanke Rays ahead of the 2018–19 CWHL season.

ZhHL

International play

Canada

Wong was a Canadian national women's under-18 team member for a three-game series against the United States in August 2007. The following year, she played with the U18 team in another series against the United States, which was held in Lake Placid, New York. Wong won a silver medal with the national U18 team at the 2009 IIHF Women's U18 World Championship.

She graduated to the Canadian national under-22 team (also called the national development team) as part of a three-game series in Calgary in August 2009. Wong won a gold medal with the national under-22 team at the 2010 MLP Nations Cup in Ravensburg, Germany. In August 2010, she suited up for the national under-22 team once more as part of a three-game series versus the United States in Toronto during August 2010. At the 2011 MLP Cup, Wong was part of another gold medal winning squad.

China
Wong was selected for the China women's national ice hockey team to play at the 2022 Winter Olympics in Beijing, China. She registered a secondary assist on China's first goal in their first game of the tournament, a goal scored by Hannah Miller (Mi Le) against .

Awards and honours
2010 Nova Scotia Sport Female Team Athlete of the Year
2010 NCAA National Collegiate Women's Ice Hockey Tournament All-Tournament Team
Cape Breton Post Athlete of the Year in 2009, 2010, and 2011
2011 All-WCHA Second Team

Career statistics

Hockey Canada

Minnesota Duluth

CWHL

ZhHL

International

References

External links

1991 births
Living people
Calgary Inferno players
Canadian expatriate ice hockey players in China
Canadian sportspeople of Chinese descent
Canadian women's ice hockey defencemen
Ice hockey people from Nova Scotia
Ice hockey players at the 2022 Winter Olympics
Minnesota Duluth Bulldogs women's ice hockey players
Olympic ice hockey players of China
People from Baddeck, Nova Scotia
Shenzhen KRS Vanke Rays players